Dog Daze is a 1939 Our Gang short comedy film directed by George Sidney.  It was the 181st Our Gang short (182nd episode, 93rd talking short, 94th talking episode, and 13th MGM produced episode) that was released.

Plot
The gang must raise 37 cents to pay off Butch. After earning a dollar for taking care of an injured dog, the kids hit upon a sure-fire moneymaking scheme; they will "rescue" every dog in town, thereby collecting a dollar from each grateful owner. Naturally, the pet owners are upset when their pooches mysteriously disappear, and before long the gang is in hot water with the cops.

Cast
 Darla Hood as Darla
 Eugene Lee as Porky
 George McFarland as Spanky
 Carl Switzer as Alfalfa
 Billie Thomas as Buckwheat
 Scotty Beckett as Wilbur

Additional cast
 Tommy Bond as Butch
 Sidney Kibrick as Woim
 Wade Boteler as Precinct Officer Riley
 Lee Phelps as Officer Sweeney
 John Power as Captain Pindle

See also
 Our Gang filmography

References

External links

1939 films
American black-and-white films
Films directed by George Sidney
Metro-Goldwyn-Mayer short films
1939 comedy films
Our Gang films
Films about dogs
1939 short films
Films about animals
1930s American films